Hermann Stern (24 May 1878 – 24 August 1952) was an Austrian lawyer, local politician, and economic pioneer.

Early life 
Born in Bolzano, South Tyrol, Hermann Stern was the seventh of the ten children of Johann Joachim Stern, a Jew who converted to Catholicism, and Gertraud Stern née Lechthaler.

In 1902, he received his doctorate in law from the University of Innsbruck and passed his bar exam in 1906. He was initially secretary of the "Association of Catholic Agricultural Workers" in Innsbruck. In 1910, he moved to Reutte (Tyrol, Austria) as a lawyer.

Career 
Stern initially had a good relationship with the Social Democrats but was never one of them himself. Together with the social democrat August Wagner, he initiated the first democratization movement in Reutte. The Social Democratic Party said the following about him in 1920: 

This translates to, “Although Dr. Stern does not belong to the Social Democratic Party, nor has he run for election by the party, we appreciate that he has always stood up firmly for the workers and because he also has a heart for the poorer population."

In 1918, Stern played a vital role in a democracy movement in Reutte that aimed to restructure the town in a gradual process. In 1919, he became a member of the municipal council of Reutte. There he held various positions until 1927, ultimately as the deputy mayor. Within the municipal council, he was responsible for the successful expansion of the municipal power station in Reutte and for the establishment of a hospital in the social field.

When sugar prices doubled on December 1, 1919, there were major conflicts because the available sugar had not been distributed to the population before December 1. The district authorities claimed that there was not enough sugar and that it was mainly needed only for the sick. Research by the Social Democrats and with the active support of Dr. Stern, however, brought to light that the Schretter company owned almost 10 times the declared amount of sugar. Through Stern's work, the sugar was confiscated and distributed to the population.

As an economic pioneer, he pursued the course of using the available resources, such as water, wood, and electricity, for an economic upswing. Thanks to the greater power generation he brought about. In 1922, he succeeded in persuading Paul Schwarzkopf to found the Plansee metal works. He founded an oil plant to exploit natural resources and several wood processing companies to promote the natural abundance of wood.

In 1923, Stern was the executive director of the Tiroler Oelwerke LLC.

His main economic project was the construction of a cable car up to the Zugspitze. The completion of this project in 1926 brought him to the peak of his popularity and also initiated his personal tragedy because the project failed due to the economic situation caused by the thousand-mark ban on the German Reich imposed by Hitler.

Personal life 
In 1911, he married Anna Knittel, the daughter of a school inspector, Josef Knittel. They gave birth to five children.

Exile and death 

In 1926, he was made an honorary citizen of the municipality of Ehrwald for his services to the construction of the cable car up to the Zugspitze (de:Zugspitzbahn). This honorary citizenship was withdrawn from him in 1940 because of his Jewish descent. In 1938, the German racial laws labeled him as a "half-Jew." His offices were confiscated and he was imprisoned for 15 months. To keep him away from Tyrol forever, Gauleiter Franz Hofer had him expelled to Nuremberg. Stern went blind, returned in 1945 as a seriously ill man, and tried in vain to be rehabilitated. He died in Innsbruck on August 24, 1952.

Honor 
In 1947, he was admitted to the bar again. His confiscation was expressly revoked by the municipality of Ehrwald in 1998. In 2017, the market municipality of Reutte unveiled a commemorative plaque in Hermann Stern's former home, which highlights some of his achievements.

References 

1878 births
20th-century Austrian lawyers
Austrian politicians
South Tyrolean nationalists
People from South Tyrol
People from Bolzano
1952 deaths
Austrian people of Jewish descent